La Colectiva Tabacalera (Spanish for The Tobacco Collective) is a historic building located in the historical center of the Puerto Rican municipality of Manatí. It has had many uses throughout its history, and it was added to the United States National Register of Historic Places in 1988. It is a two-story combination of two buildings.

Gallery

References 

National Register of Historic Places in Manatí, Puerto Rico
Commercial buildings on the National Register of Historic Places in Puerto Rico
1880 establishments in Puerto Rico
Commercial buildings completed in 1880
Tobacco buildings